Kardorff is a surname of:
	
 Wilhelm von Kardorff (8 January 1828 – 21 July 1907), German landowner and politician who supported the Free Conservative Party
 Siegfried von Kardorff (4 February 1873 − 12 October 1945), German politician